The 2015 IFCPF CP Football World Championships was the world championship for men's national 7-a-side association football teams. IFCPF stands for International Federation of Cerebral Palsy Football. Athletes with a physical disability competed. The Championship took place in the England from 16 to 28 June 2015.

Football CP Football was played with modified FIFA rules. Among the modifications were that there were seven players, no offside, a smaller playing field, and permission for one-handed throw-ins. Matches consisted of two thirty-minute halves, with a fifteen-minute half-time break. The Championships was a qualifying event for the Rio de Janeiro 2016 Paralympic Games.

Participating teams and officials

Qualifying
The following teams are qualified for the tournament:

1 = The Iranian CP football team drew their participation back shortly before the World Cup

The draw
During the draw, the teams were divided into pots because of rankings. Here, the following groups:

1 = The Iranian CP football team drew their participation back shortly before the World Cup

Squads
The individual teams contact following football gamblers on to:
Group A

Group B

Group C

Group D

Venue 
The venue to be used for the World Championships were located in Burton-upon-Trent.

Format

The first round, or group stage, was a competition between the 16 teams divided among four groups of four, where each group engaged in a round-robin tournament within itself. The two highest ranked teams in each group advanced to the knockout stage for the position one to eight, the two lower ranked teams played for the positions nine to 16. Teams were awarded three points for a win and one for a draw. When comparing teams in a group over-all result came before head-to-head.

In the knockout stage there were three rounds (quarter-finals, semi-finals and the final). The winners plays for the higher positions, the losers for the lower positions. For any match in the knockout stage, a draw after 60 minutes of regulation time was followed by two 10 minute periods of extra time to determine a winner. If the teams were still tied, a penalty shoot-out was held to determine a winner.

Classification
Athletes with a physical disability competed. The athlete's disability was caused by a non-progressive brain damage that affects motor control, such as cerebral palsy, traumatic brain injury or stroke. Athletes must be ambulant.

Players were classified by level of disability.
C5: Athletes with difficulties when walking and running, but not in standing or when kicking the ball.
C6: Athletes with control and co-ordination problems of their upper limbs, especially when running.
C7: Athletes with hemiplegia.
C8: Athletes with minimal disability; must meet eligibility criteria and have an impairment that has impact on the sport of football.

Teams must field at least one class C5 or C6 player at all times. No more than two players of class C8 are permitted to play at the same time.

Group stage
The first round, or group stage, have seen the sixteen teams divided into four groups of four teams.

Group A

Group B

Group C

Group D

Knockout stage

Quarter-finals
Position 9-16

Position 1-8

Semi-finals
Position 13-16

Position 9-12

Position 5-8

Position 1-4

Finals
Position 15-16

Position 13-14

Position 11-12

Position 9-10

Position 7-8

Position 5-6

Position 3-4

Final

Statistics

Goalscorers
12 goals
  Volodymyr Antonyuk

8 goals
  Jack Rutter

7 goals
  Eduard Ramonov
  Trevor Stiles

6 goals
  Jose Carols Monteiro Guimarães
  Dillon Sheridan
  Wanderson Silva de Oliveira

5 goals
  Aleksandr Kuligin

4 goals

  James Blackwell
  Artem Krasylnykov
  Dimitrii Pestretsov
  Vitalii Romanchuk
  Fernandes Celso Alves Vieira

3 goals

  Alexei Borkin
  Jan Francisco Brito da Costa
  Jake Brown
  Barry Halloran
  Martin Hickman
  Peter Kooij
  Ivan Potekhin
  Jessi Junior Yari Villegas
  Iljas Visker

2 goals

  Georgiy Albegov
  Harry Barker
  Matias Agustin Bassi
  Sam Charron
  Alexey Chesmin
  Matt Crossen
  Felipe Rafael da Silva Gomes
  Hugo Manuel da Silva Pinheiro
  Luke Evans
  Matias Emiliano Fernandez
  David Navarro Garza
  Evandro de Oliveira Gomes de Souza
  Kyle Hannin
  Kevin Tyler Hensley
  Seth David Jahn
  Viacheslav Larionov
  Jonatas Santos Machado
  Gary Messett
  Jamie Mitchell
  Ollie Nugent
  Jonathan Paterson
  Ian Paton
  Tiago Ribeiro Baptista Ramos
  Jeroen Saedt
  Aslanbek Sapiev
  Minne de Vos
  Jordan Walker

 1 goal

  Darren Aitken
  Adam Kyle Ballou
  David Barber
  Bryce Zachary Boarman
  Lars Conijn
  Cormac Birt
  Ubirajara da Silva Magalhães
  Dustin Hodgson
  Edhar Kahramanian
  David Levy
  Rodrigo Eloy Lugrin
  Richard Alexander Mogollon Melendez
  Mariano Andres Morana
  Lasha Murvanadze
  Eric O'Flaherty
  Shotaro Osawa
  Zaurbek Pagaev
  Christopher Pyne
  Mark Robertson
  Emyle Rudder
  Jeroen Schuitert
  Artem Sheremet
  Darragh Snell
  Taisei Taniguchi
  Tiago Carneiro
  Tetsuya Toda
  Aleksey Tumakov
  James Turner
  George van Altena
  Vítor Emanuel Ribeiro Vilarinho
  Ryan Walker
  Yevhen Zinoviev

own goals

  Barry Halloran
  ??
  ??
  ??

Ranking

See also

References

External links
Official website
Official website from 5 April 2016
Cerebral Palsy International Sports & Recreation Association (CPISRA)
International Federation of Cerebral Palsy Football (IFCPF)

CP football
2015 in association football
2015
2014–15 in English football
Paralympic association football